Somerset 3 South (known as Tribute Somerset 3 South for sponsorship reasons) is an English rugby union league which sits at the eleven level of league rugby union in England alongside its counterpart Somerset 3 North.  When the division was founded in 1987 it was a single league known as Somerset 3, but since 2006 it has been split into two regional divisions.

Somerset 3 South currently involves teams from the southern part of Somerset - although this means anywhere in the county outside  Bristol.  1st, 2nd, 3rd and even 4th XV sides can participate in the division as long as they are not from the same club.  The league champions, and occasionally runners up, are promoted to Somerset 2 South and there is no relegation as this is the lowest level of league rugby in Somerset.

Teams 2021-22

2020–21
Due to the COVID-19 pandemic, the 2020–21 season was cancelled.

Teams 2019–20

Original teams
When league rugby began in 1987 this league (known as Somerset 3) was a single division containing the following teams from Somerset and parts of Bristol:

Avonvale
Backwell
Bath Civil Service
Castle Cary
Chew Valley
Morganians
Old Ashtonians
Tor
Wincanton
Westland

Somerset 3 honours

Somerset 3 (1987–1989)
The original Somerset 3 was a tier 10 league with promotion to Somerset 2 and there was no relegation.

Somerset 3A / 3B (1989–1990)
For the 1989–90 season Somerset 3 split into two regional leagues - Somerset 3A and Somerset 3B - both at tier 10 of the league system.  Promotion continued to Somerset 2 and there was no relegation.

Somerset 3 (1990–1993)
After a single season Somerset 3 reverted to being a single division at tier 10 of the league system.  Promotion continued to Somerset 2 and there was no relegation.

Somerset 3 (1993–1996)
The creation of National League 5 South for the 1993–94 season meant that Somerset 3 dropped to become a tier 12 league.  Promotion continued to Somerset 2 and there was no relegation.

Somerset 3 (1996–2000)
The cancellation of National League 5 South at the end of the 1995–96 season meant that Somerset 3 reverted to being a tier 11 league.  Promotion continued to Somerset 2 and there was no relegation.  Somerset 3 was cancelled at the end of the 1999–2000 season and all teams transferred into Somerset 2.

Somerset 3 South
After an absence of six years, Somerset 3 returned - now split into two regional tier 10 divisions - Somerset 3 North and Somerset 3 South.  This restructuring was to enable 2nd XV and 3rd XV sides to play in the Somerset leagues for the first time.  Promotion was now to Somerset 2 South and there was no relegation.  From the 2007–08 season onward the league sponsor would be Tribute.

Somerset 3 South (2009–present)

Number of league titles

Avonvale (2)
Hornets III (2)
St. Brendan's Old Boys(2)
Taunton III (2)
Backwell (1)
Bath Old Edwardians (1)
Blagdon (1)
Bridgwater & Albion III (1)
British Gas (1)
Burnham-on-Sea II (1)
Castle Cary (1)
Chard (1)
Cheddar Valley II (1)
Chew Valley (1)
Chew Valley II (1)
Frome III (1)
Martock (1)
Tor II (1)
Wellington (1)
Wellington III (1)
Weston-super-Mare III (1)
Weston-super-Mare IV (1)
Wiveliscombe (1)
Yeovil II (1)

See also 
 South West Division RFU
 Somerset RFU
 Somerset Premier
 Somerset 1
 Somerset 2 North
 Somerset 2 South
 Somerset 3 North
 English rugby union system
 Rugby union in England

Notes

References 

11
Rugby union in Somerset